Oosting is a surname. Notable persons with that name include:

 Gerrit Oosting (1941–2012), Dutch politician
 Henry J. Oosting (1903–1968), American ecologist 
 Jeanne Bieruma Oosting (1898–1994), Dutch artist
 Joseph Oosting (born 1972), Dutch footballer
 Menno Oosting (1964–1999), Dutch tennis player

Dutch-language surnames